Haddada is a district in Souk Ahras Province, Algeria. It was named after its capital, Haddada.

Municipalities
The district is further divided into 3 municipalities:
Haddada
Khedara 
Ouled Moumen

Districts of Souk Ahras Province
Souk Ahras Province